Roland Polareczki (born 20 May 1990 in Lenti) is a Hungarian striker who currently plays for Zalaegerszegi TE.

External links 
 HLSZ 
 MLSZ 

1990 births
Living people
People from Lenti
Hungarian footballers
Association football forwards
Zalaegerszegi TE players
Soproni VSE players
NK Nafta Lendava players
Hungarian expatriate footballers
Expatriate footballers in Slovenia
Hungarian expatriate sportspeople in Slovenia
Sportspeople from Zala County